Proprioseiopsis farallonicus is a species of mite in the family Phytoseiidae.

References

farallonicus
Articles created by Qbugbot
Animals described in 1991